The 2008 Ulster Senior Football Championship was the 120th installment of the annual Ulster Senior Football Championship held under the auspices of the Ulster GAA. It was won by Armagh who defeated Fermanagh in the final after a replay. This was Armagh's sixth title since the turn of the century and their 14th overall. Fermanagh were appearing in their first final since 1982.

Steven McDonnell, 2003's Player of the Year, was the top scorer, hitting 1-17 in Armagh's run to victory in Ulster. Although defeated after a replay by Down in the first round of the Ulster Championship, Tyrone emerged as victors in the 2008 All-Ireland Senior Football Championship, beating Kerry in the 2008 All-Ireland Senior Football Championship Final.

Draw
With the usual nine teams contesting the Championship, Antrim and Cavan met in the preliminary round to reduce the field to eight. The draw, made in October 2007, also produced two big opening round clashes: Tyrone against Down and Donegal against Derry.

Bracket

Match details

Top scorers
Steve McDonnell 1-17 (20)
Seanie Johnston 0-14 (14)
Paddy Bradley 0-13 (13)
Ronan Clarke 1-9 (12)
Aidan Carr 0-10 (10)
Colm McCullagh 1-6 (9)
Benny Coulter 2-3 (9)

References

External links
Ulster GAA website

2U
Gaelic
Ulster Senior Football Championship